The Saluzzo Race Walking School (Scuola del Cammino di Saluzzo) is an international race walking school in Saluzzo, Piedmont, Italy.

History
The school was established in 2002 by the brothers Giorgio, Maurizio and Sandro Damilano. Former champion race walkers Maurizio and Giorgio trained for Olympic Games and other championships on the roads around Saluzzo. Sandro Damilano is an athletics coach and Director of the school.

It is an international training center for race walking, with accommodation for up to 12 people. It is also a centre for the diffusion of fitwalking.

See also

Power walking
Fitwalking

References

External links

 Development - ATC Saluzzo at IAAF web site

Sports academies
International schools in Italy